Langham House may refer to:

in the United Kingdom

 Higher Langham House, a grade II listed building in Gillingham, Dorset
 Langham House Close, a grade II* 1950's Brutalist architectural-style development in Ham, London
 Langham House, Ham, a grade II 18th-century house on Ham Common, London
 Langham House, Rode. a grade II* house in Rode, Somerset

See also
 Langham (disambiguation)